Agios Georgios is a village located in the Limassol District of Cyprus, approximately 20 km north of Limassol.

References

Communities in Limassol District